Epicrocis nigrinella is a species of snout moth in the genus Epicrocis. It was described by Boris Balinsky in 1994 and is found in Namibia and South Africa.

References

Moths described in 1994
Phycitini
Insects of Namibia
Moths of Africa